Frankenstein is a 1910 American short silent horror film produced by Edison Studios. It was directed by J. Searle Dawley, who also wrote the one-reeler's screenplay, broadly basing his "scenario" on Mary Shelley's 1818 novel Frankenstein; or, The Modern Prometheus. This short motion picture is generally recognized by film historians as the first screen adaptation of Shelley's work. The small cast, who are not credited in the surviving 1910 print of the film, includes Augustus Phillips as Dr. Frankenstein, Charles Ogle as Frankenstein's monster, and Mary Fuller as the doctor's fiancée.

Plot
Described as "a liberal adaptation of Mrs. Shelley's famous story", the film shows young Frankenstein (his first name in the book, Victor, is never mentioned) discovering the "mystery of life" after two years at university. He gives life to a creature built by mixing different chemicals, and the monster follows Frankenstein back to his parents' house. The conclusion, completely different from Mary Shelley's book, shows the creature disappearing after seeing its own reflection in the mirror, and without killing Victor's younger brother or his fiancée Elizabeth, as happened in the novel.

The film's plot description in a 1910 issue of the studio's trade periodical Edison Kinetogram provides considerable detail about the company's screen adaptation:

Cast
 Mary Fuller as Elizabeth 
 Charles Stanton Ogle as The Monster 
 Augustus Phillips as Frankenstein

Production

J. Searle Dawley, working in his third year for Edison Studios, shot the film in three days at the company's Bronx facilities in New York City on January 13, 15 and 17, 1910. Staff writers for the Edison Kinetogram assured theatergoers in 1910 that the company's film adaptation was deliberately designed to de-emphasize the horrific aspects of Shelley's story and to focus instead on the tale's "mystic and psychological" elements: 
The film was reported in the Edison Kinetogram as having a length of 975 feet, giving it a runtime of approximately sixteen minutes at silent film rates (16 FPS), or closer to eleven minutes at modern rates (24 FPS).

Reception
Newspapers and magazines of the time, such as New York newspapers The Film Index and The Moving Picture World, highlighted the monster creation scene as "the most remarkable ever committed to a film". After the film's official premiere, on April 9, The Moving Picture World published a negative review signed by W. Stephen Bush, probably one of the first critics to worry about what could be shown in films:

Music
Frankenstein was among the earlier silent films to have an associated cue sheet, providing suggested musical accompaniment. From the cue sheet:

The pieces include "You'll Remember Me" from the 1843 opera The Bohemian Girl, the 1852 "Melody in F", "dramatic music" (presumably the "Wolf's Glen" scene) from the 1821 opera Der Freischütz, the 1835 song "Annie Laurie", and the Bridal Chorus from the 1850 opera Lohengrin.

Copyright status
The film, just as all other motion pictures released before , is now in the public domain in the  United States.

Rediscovery and preservation
For many years, it was believed a lost film. In 1963, a plot description and stills (below) were discovered published from the March 15, 1910, issue of the film catalog The Edison Kinetogram. For many years, these images were the only widely available visual record of the Charles Ogle version of the monster.

In the early 1950s, a print of this film was purchased by a Wisconsin film collector, Alois F. Dettlaff, from his mother-in-law, who also collected films. He did not realize its rarity until many years later. Its existence was first revealed in the mid-1970s. Although somewhat deteriorated, the film was in viewable condition, complete with titles and tints as seen in 1910. Dettlaff had a 35 mm preservation copy made in the late 1970s. He also issued a DVD release of 1,000 copies.

BearManor Media released the public domain film in a restored edition on March 18, 2010, alongside the novel Edison's Frankenstein, which was written by Frederick C. Wiebel, Jr.

In 2016, the film society of the University of Geneva undertook their own restoration of the film, with image restoration by Julien Dumoulin and an original soundtrack by Nicolas Hafner, performed on a Wurlitzer theatre organ located at College Claparède. The restored version of the film was shown on 10 October 2016.

On November 15, 2018, in recognition of Mary Shelly's bicentennial, the Library of Congress announced via a blog post that they had completed a full restoration of the short film, having purchased the Dettlaff collection in 2014. The restoration was made available to the general public for streaming and downloading via their YouTube channel and online National Screening Room, as well as in the blog post announcing the restoration's completion. A new soundtrack was scored and performed by Donald Sosin.

Comic book adaptation
In 2003 Chris Yambar and Robb Bihun published the graphic novel Edison Frankenstein 1910, directly based on the 1910 Frankenstein film adaptation.

See also
 List of films featuring Frankenstein's monster
 List of American films of 1910
 List of rediscovered films

References

Further reading

External links

 Full film at the Library of Congress website
 
 
 
 
 
 "Edison's Frankenstein: Cinema's First Horror Film" by Rich Drees
 Film Threat essay on the film's history

1910 films
1910 horror films
1910s English-language films
American science fiction horror films
American black-and-white films
American silent short films
Films directed by J. Searle Dawley
Films shot in New York City
Frankenstein films
Articles containing video clips
1910s science fiction horror films
1910s rediscovered films
Films produced by Thomas Edison
Rediscovered American films
1910s American films
Films adapted into comics
Silent science fiction horror films